Allouville-Bellefosse is a commune in the Seine-Maritime department, Normandy, northern France.

Geography

Population

Places of interest
 The church of St.Quentin, dating from the sixteenth century.
 Chêne chapelle, a 1000-year-old oak tree (the oldest in France). The tree houses two chapels, the lower dedicated to Notre Dame de la Paix and the upper called the Cellule de l'Eremite.
 The sixteenth-century abandoned church at Bellefosse.
 A natural history museum.
 The eighteenth-century château, in Louis XV style.
 Two manorhouses, at Bellefosse and Ismenil.

See also
Communes of the Seine-Maritime department

References

External links

 Official website of Allouville-Bellefosse 

Communes of Seine-Maritime